Laurent Pardo (born Bayonne, 19 February 1958) is a former French rugby union player. He played as fullback, wing and centre.

He played for Aviron Bayonnais, from 1978/79 to 1982/83. He won the Challenge Yves-du-Manoir in 1980 and was runners-up of the Top 14 in 1981/82. He played afterwards for US Montferrand, from 1982/83 to 1986/87. He also played for Racing Club de France, Stade Hendayais, in France, and for San Sebastián, in Spain.

He had 14 caps for France, from 1980 to 1985, scoring 3 tries, 12 points on aggregate. He played three times at the Five Nations Championship in 1981, 1982 and 1985, being winner in the first edition. He had 9 caps and scored all the points of his international career at the competition.

He is currently vice-president of Stade Hendayais.

References

External links
Laurent Pardo International Statistics

1958 births
Living people
French rugby union players
Sportspeople from Bayonne
France international rugby union players
Rugby union fullbacks
Rugby union wings
Rugby union centres